Łączka may refer to the following villages in Poland:
 Łączka, Siedlce County in Masovian Voivodeship (east-central Poland)
 Łączka, Wyszków County in Masovian Voivodeship (east-central Poland)
 Łączka, Silesian Voivodeship (south Poland)
 Łączka, West Pomeranian Voivodeship (north-west Poland)